Axel Matus (born 17 June 1998 in Guadalajara) is a Mexican racing driver backed by Escuderia Telmex.

Career

Karting
Matus first began karting in 2002, at the age of four. From 2007 onwards, he competed in major karting championships across Mexico and the United States.

Lower Formulae
In 2014, Matus made his debut in French F4, finishing twenty first in his debut season. He returned the following year, claimed his maiden victory and finished seventh overall. In October 2014, Matus was among four drivers invited to join the testing of the Ferrari Driver Academy. But he wasn't included into it.

In 2015, Matus went on to become Formula Panam champion and the inaugural NACAM Formula 4 champion.

Formula Renault
In January 2017, Matus signed with AVF for the Eurocup Championship. He was just one from five drivers who wasn't able to secure a points-finishing position, ending the season 24th.

Career

Career summary

† As Matus was a guest driver, he was ineligible for points.

References

External links
 

1998 births
Living people
Sportspeople from Guadalajara, Jalisco
Mexican racing drivers
French F4 Championship drivers
Formula Renault Eurocup drivers
Formula Renault 2.0 NEC drivers
Auto Sport Academy drivers
AV Formula drivers
NACAM F4 Championship drivers